Machihata, or Machhihata, is an union council in the southern part of Brahmanbaria Sadar, Brahmanbaria, Bangladesh. It borders Suhilpur and Pattan to the north, Singerbil and Uttar Akhaura to the east, Vasudev to the south, Sultanpur and Ramrail to the west, and Brahmanbaria to the northwest. The union council covers an area of 31.97 km2. As of 2011, its population is 40,509.

Demographics 
According to the 2011 Census of Bangladesh, the total population of Machihata Union is 40,509. Among them, 19,224 are male and 21,285 are female. Total number of households are 7,568.

Government 
Machihata is the 13th union council under Brahmanbaria Sadar Upazila. The administrative activities of the union are under the jurisdiction of Brahmanbaria Sadar Police Station. It is also a part of Brahmanbaria-3 Constituency of the Jatiya Sangsad.

Administrative divisions 
The union is divided into the following 18 villages:

Places of interest 

 Machihata Darbar Sharif
 Bank of Titāsa River, Kachite

Education system 
According to 2011 census, the literally rate of Machihata Union is 61.1%. The region has 9 public primary schools, 3 private schools, 2 high schools, and 6 Madrasas.

See also 

 Brahmanbaria Sadar Upazila
 Brahmanbaria District
 Union councils of Bangladesh

References 

Unions of Brahmanbaria District